Suria (formerly Suria FM) is a Malay language-private radio station under the Star Media Radio Group, a company owned by Star Media Group Berhad. Suria FM first aired on 24 November 2005. The station's programming is targeted toward modern Malays, aged between 25 to 35. The station interacts with listeners through social media. The broadcasts feature a mix of local all-time favourites and chart-topping hits with some of the latest Indonesian and K-pop songs.

As of 2018, Suria remains as one of the top five Malay-language radio stations of choice.

On 9 November 2019, Suria ceased transmission in Kota Kinabalu, Sabah.

Notable announcers

Current 
 Shuib Sepathu
 Roslinda Abdul Majid (DJ Lin)
 Feeya Iskandar
 Sharifah Shahirah (Rara)

Former 
 Adibah Noor (died in June 2022)
 Halim Othman

Frequency

Television 

Suria is also available online at www.suria.my.*

References

External links 
 
 
 
 

2005 establishments in Malaysia
Klang Valley
Radio stations established in 2005
Radio stations in Malaysia
Mass media in Kuala Lumpur
Malay-language radio stations